Plateumaris frosti is a species of aquatic leaf beetle in the family Chrysomelidae. It is found in North America.

References

Further reading

 
 
 
 

Donaciinae
Beetles described in 1935